Great Houghton may refer to:

Great Houghton, Northamptonshire, England
Great Houghton, South Yorkshire, England
Great Houghton Halt, a railway station in South Yorkshire, England
Great Houghton Cricket Club, a cricket club in Northampton, England